Hiob may refer to:

People with the surname Hiob:
 Hanne Hiob (1923–2009), German actress

People with the given name Hiob:
 Hiob Ludolf (1624–1704), German orientalist

Other:
 Job (novel), a novel by Joseph Roth with the original title Hiob

See also

 Hib (disambiguation)
 Hob (disambiguation)
 Job (disambiguation)